In Greek mythology, the name Chalcon (Χάλκων) may refer to:

Chalcon, one of the Telchines.
Chalcon, a Myrmidonian, father of Bathycles who was killed by Glaucus in the Trojan War.
Chalcon, father of a daughter Antiochis who, in one version, married Polybus of Corinth.
Chalcon, son of Metion and possible father of the Euboean Abas.
Chalcon of Cyparissia, charioteer, shield-bearer and tutor of Antilochus. During the Trojan War, he fell in love with Penthesilea and was killed by Achilles upon coming to her aid.
Chalcon occasionally refers to characters otherwise known under the name Chalcodon, including:
Chalcon of Cos, a Coan prince as the son of King Eurypylus and Clytie. He was the brother of Chalciope and Antagoras. Chalcon succeeded his father to the throne of Cos.
Chalcon, a suitor of Hippodamia.

Notes

Myrmidons
Achaeans (Homer)

References 

 Apollodorus, The Library with an English Translation by Sir James George Frazer, F.B.A., F.R.S. in 2 Volumes, Cambridge, MA, Harvard University Press; London, William Heinemann Ltd. 1921. ISBN 0-674-99135-4. Online version at the Perseus Digital Library. Greek text available from the same website.
 Hesiod, Catalogue of Women from Homeric Hymns, Epic Cycle, Homerica translated by Evelyn-White, H G. Loeb Classical Library Volume 57. London: William Heinemann, 1914. Online version at theio.com
 Homer, The Iliad with an English Translation by A.T. Murray, Ph.D. in two volumes. Cambridge, MA., Harvard University Press; London, William Heinemann, Ltd. 1924. Online version at the Perseus Digital Library.
 Homer, Homeri Opera in five volumes. Oxford, Oxford University Press. 1920. Greek text available at the Perseus Digital Library.

People of the Trojan War
Princes in Greek mythology